1-inch type A (designated Type A by SMPTE) is a reel-to-reel helical scan analog recording videotape format developed by Ampex in 1965, that was one of the first standardized reel-to-reel magnetic tape formats in the 1–inch (25 mm) width; most others of that size at that time were proprietary. It was capable of 350 lines.

Usage
Type A was developed as mainly an industrial and institutional format, where it saw the most success. It was not widely used for broadcast television, since it did not meet Federal Communications Commission (FCC) specifications for broadcast videotape formats; the only format passing the FCC's muster at the time was the then-industry-standard 2-inch quadruplex.
   
The Type A format received broad use by the White House Communications Agency from 1966 to 1969. The WHCA, under U.S. President Lyndon B. Johnson, used the format to videotape television broadcasts off the air or from direct White House feeds. The WHCA recorded programs and events including television appearances by President Johnson, special news broadcasts and news interview programs. Beginning on April 1, 1968, the WHCA taping system was expanded to also include daily morning and evening news programs, both network and local. When U.S. President Richard M. Nixon succeeded Johnson in office in 1969, the WHCA's Type A recording system was continued until it was gradually phased out, later that year, in favor of a recording system using a 2-inch format.

The format was also used by the Vanderbilt Television News Archive at Vanderbilt University in Nashville, Tennessee, upon the archive's founding in 1968.  The archive would continue to use the Type A format to make black & white recordings of national television newscasts (received off-air, and recorded by the archive, from the local Nashville network-affiliated TV stations that aired them) until 1979, when the archive upgraded to full-color-capable U-Matic VCRs for recording.

Technical details
Early VTRs were black-and-white (B/W) only, later VTRs supported color television, with a heterodyne playback. Still later units had time base correction playback, like the VPR-1 that could be used at television station and post-production houses.

The VPR-1 had several problems, it did not record the vertical blanking interval, which is why it was not compliant to FCC broadcast standards. The video quality was not as good as other broadcast VTRs. Thus Sony  and Ampex agreed to make a SMPTE approved type C format VTR (which was based on Type A). Hitachi also later made a C format VTR.

Some Ampex Type A models
VP-4900 (1965) B/W Player only, no record option.
VR-5000 (1965) B/W Record-player, very popular, many made.
VR-5100 (1965) B/W  3 MHz with horizontal resolution of 300 lines, noise ratio of 42 dB.
VR-5200  VR-5100 (1965) B/W with TV Tuner.
VPR-5200 VR-5200 with professional connectors
VR-5800  Low and high band. Very popular, many made.
VPR-5800  VR-5800 with professional connectors
XVR-5800 Medical certified 1 Type A VTR.
VR-5803  PAL VR-5800 TVR
VR-6000  Low band VTR, With stop motion mode added. Wood case.
VR-6003  PAL VR-6000
VR-6050   Low band VTR, very basic, low cost.
VR-6275 (1966) Wood cabinet with a two TV Tuners (one watch one to record), load speakers.
VR-6300 (1966) VR-6275 without the TV Tuner.
VR-7000 Microphone input add, playback RF modulator, low and high band and other improvements.
VR-7100 (1967)With roll around cart, self-contained, with TV tuner, small monitor and B&W camera.
VR-7300 (1968) Color option with external color stabilizer. Hetrodyne color processor.
VR-7003  PAL VR-7300.
VL-7404  A time lapse VTR. Up to 38 hours with 9-3/4" reel of 3000' 1" tape. $5,900
VR-7450
VR-7500  Rec/play B&W and color. 4.2 MHz video bandwidth. Very popular, many made.
XVR-7500 higher record band, better color pictures. Professional connectors
VR-7503  PAL VR-7500
VR-7800  Editing added, Color option. 1st with removable electronic cards for servicing.$9,500 in 1968.
VPR-7800  VR-7800 Professional.
VR-7803  PAL VR-7800
VP-4500C A VR-7800 VTR, but a Player only, no record option, heterodyne color processor.
VR-7900  Is a VPR-7800 with an extra modulation standard added is very high, same quality as quad high band. 1975
VPR-7900A (TBC option, the TBC-790, 1975)
VR-7903  PAL VR-7900
VPR-7950A Console model of the VR7900, with monitoring and a TBC (TBC-790 analog, TBC-800 digital).
VPR-1 (1976) Studio VTR, Digital TBC with SlowMo and still frame. Quickly replaced with C format, VPR-2 in 1976.
VPR-10 (1976) Portable VPR1, discontinued before delivery, replaced with VPR-20, C format in 1977.

See also
Video tape recorder (VTR)
Type B videotape
Type C videotape
IVC videotape format
Ampex 2 inch helical VTR

References

Notes

External links
labguysworld Link to a 1" Type A VTR, the Ampex VR-7300
labguysworld VPR-1 The last Type A VTR 
VidiPax Video Formats Guide
 labguysworld Other one inch VTRs 
labguysworld Ampex VR- VTRs 
labguysworld Ampex VR-6000
DC Video operator of VR-7800
Ampex page in the Experimental Television Center
 labguysworld.com Ampex VR-7100 Ops manual
lionlamb Ampex Cat.
 The History of Television, 1942 to 2000,  By Albert Abramson and Christopher H. Sterling
Rewind Museum.com Ampex
fundinguniverse.com Ampex Corporation History
AMIA Tech Review, Type A and The Everly Brothers Show by Ralph Sargent with Al Sturm

Videotape
Products introduced in 1965